Deny may refer to:

 Denial, in ordinary English usage, an assertion that a statement or allegation is not true

Music 
 Deny (band), an Argentine post-hardcore band
 Deny (album), a 1992 album by the Ex Pistols
 "Deny", 2001 song by Default
 "Deny", a song by the Clash from the album The Clash, 1977

People 
 Jacques Deny (1916–2016), French mathematician
 Deny King (1909–1991), Australian naturalist
 Deny Marcel (born 1983), Indonesian footballer

See also 

 Denys
 Denyer
 
 Denial (disambiguation)
 Denier (disambiguation)
 Refusal (disambiguation)